Martin's Brandon Church, also known as Brandon Church and as Martin's Brandon Episcopal Church, is a historic Episcopal church located at 18706 James River Drive in Burrowsville, Virginia.   Martin's Brandon Parish was formed in the early 17th century and derives its name from the nearby Martin's Brandon Plantation patented by Captain John Martin in 1616.  The current church was designed by noted Baltimore architect Niernsee & Neilson and built in 1855 as a replacement for an earlier sanctuary that once stood directly across Route 10 near the site of the Burrowsville School.  Several of its beautiful stained glass windows were designed by Louis Comfort Tiffany. A cherished possession of Brandon Church is a silver communion chalice known as the "Communion Cupp" that has been used by Martin's Brandon Parish since the 17th century.  The property also includes the contributing church cemetery.

The church was listed on the U.S. National Register of Historic Places in 1980.

Notable parishioners

 Robert Williams Daniel
 Robert Williams Daniel Jr.

See also
Merchant's Hope Church, upper chapel of Martin's Brandon Parish until the mid 19th century.
Lower Brandon Plantation, also known  as Martin's Brandon or as Brandon
Upper Brandon Plantation

References

External links
 Martin's Brandon Episcopal Church Facebook account

1613 establishments in Virginia
Churches completed in 1855
19th-century Episcopal church buildings
Churches on the National Register of Historic Places in Virginia
Episcopal churches in Virginia
Churches in Prince George County, Virginia
Religious organizations established in the 1610s
Renaissance Revival architecture in Virginia
National Register of Historic Places in Prince George County, Virginia